Ralph Dutton may refer to:

Ralph Dutton, British member of Parliament
Ralph Dutton, 8th Baron Sherborne
Sir Ralph Dutton, 1st Baronet (c. 1645–1721), of the Dutton baronets, MP for Gloucestershire

See also
Dutton (surname)